L'Independence arabe was a monthly political magazine with a special reference to the independence of the Arabs. The magazine was based in Paris, France, and published for one year in the period of 1907–1908.

History and profile
L'Independence arabe was first published in Paris in April 1907. Negip Azoury was the director, and Eugène Jung was the editor-in-chief of the magazine which was published on a monthly basis. Azoury published articles in L'Independence arabe which called for the independence of all people living in the Ottoman Empire and for the independent states for them. He argued that France should actively involve in ending the Ottoman oppression against the Arabs. His writings were also anti-Semitic which led to accusations of him being an agent of the Catholic Church. 

L'Independence arabe folded after producing 18 issues in September 1908 shortly after the declaration of the constitution in the Ottoman Empire. Because both Azoury and Jung thought that this incident would make the subjects of the Ottomans free. Azoury expressed these views in the final issue of L'Independence arabe.

References

1907 establishments in France
1908 disestablishments in France
Defunct political magazines published in France
French-language magazines
Magazines established in 1907
Magazines disestablished in 1908
Magazines published in Paris
Monthly magazines published in France